Kelsey Mitchell may refer to:
 Kelsey Mitchell (basketball) (born 1997), American professional basketball player
 Kelsey Mitchell (cyclist) (born 1993), Canadian professional track cyclist